Noah McKay also known as Nass Ordoubadi (born Nasser Talebzadeh Ordoubadi ‎; 1956 – February 13, 2009) was an Iranian-American physician.

Life and education
Noah McKay was born Nasser Ordoubadi in 1956 in Tehran, the capital of Iran. His father Mansour Talebzadeh Ordoubadi was a high ranking military officer in the Pahlavi era. After immigrating to the United States in 1974, he started his higher education at Tufts University in Massachusetts, he studied medicine and in 1983 received his M.D. from the Albert Einstein College of Medicine in New York.

Life's Work 
Dr. Noah practiced medicine as a General Practitioner in the Seattle area from 1985 to 2000. He was both an owner and physician at the General Medical Clinics.  He used the recovery of his own serious myocarditis in 1989 as an example for practicing whole body wellness with his patients.  The medical clinics were established at six locations.

In 1999, after four years of litigation with an insurance company, federal charges were filed against Dr. Noah and three clinic managers at GMC and WellNet LLC. By the end of 2000 all six clinics were shut down and he had filed for corporate and personal bankruptcy. He agreed to the government's plea bargain agreement and served 13 months of a 35 month sentence at the Sheridan Federal Prison Camp in Sheridan, Oregon. He began his sentence on Feb. 1, 2001.

He is best known for his work as a public speaker and his book "Wellness at Warp Speed" that was written about his own personal health episodes and challenges with his heart, and his experience of going to prison.

He profoundly believed that we should teach a curriculum based on love, compassion and non-violence at all our schools and colleges.

"The age of love-inspired Quantum healing is upon us; Together lets rethink a new building strategy based on the fundamental lessons of love, compassion and non-violence"—Dr. Noah 13

Health issues and death 
Noah experienced a myocarditis in 1989, and had valve replacement surgery in 2003. He suffered an aortic dissection in late 2008 and after surviving the initial surgery, succumbed to complications in early 2009.

References 

 Noah McKay's biography. drnoah.net. Retrieved August 28, 2017.
 Talebzadeh: My brother died natural death - Payvand News. Payvand News. Retrieved August 28, 2017.

External links 
 Official website of Noah Mckay includes full biography

Physicians from Tehran
1956 births
2009 deaths
Iranian emigrants to the United States
20th-century American physicians